The 1898–99 Rugby Union County Championship was the 12th edition of England's premier rugby union club competition at the time.

Durham won the competition for the first time defeating Devon in the final.

Final

See also
 English rugby union system
 Rugby union in England

References

Rugby Union County Championship
County Championship (rugby union) seasons